Albert Zinovievich Kapengut (born 4 July 1944, in Kazan, Tatarstan) is a Soviet chess master (since 1962). A holder of the International Master title, he is best known as a respected teacher, theoretician, writer, and member of the successful student Olympiad teams of the 1960s.

When living in Belarus, Kapengut won championship of Minsk (1961) and several Belarus championships: 1962, 1968, 1969, 1970 (joint), 1976, 1977, and 1978.  He finished 10th in his first Soviet Championship in 1971, ahead of many high-calibre masters such as Anatoly Lein, Efim Geller, Rafael Vaganian, and Vladimir Tukmakov.

He was the coach of GM Mikhail Tal, GM Boris Gelfand, and GM Yury Shulman among others. After 2000 Kapengut has been a permanent resident of the USA, and since 28 April 2008 he plays for the US Chess Federation.

Notes and references

External links

1944 births
Living people
Sportspeople from Kazan
Russian Jews
American chess players
Belarusian chess players
Russian chess players
Soviet chess players
Jewish chess players
Belarusian Jews
Chess International Masters
Chess coaches